Madden may refer to:

People
 Madden (surname), or Madadhan
 Madden (music producer) (born 1989), Norwegian singer, songwriter and producer

Music
 "Madden" (song), a 2019 song by Joyryde
 The Madden Brothers, an American pop rock duo

Places
 Madden, Alberta, Canada
 Madden, County Armagh, Northern Ireland
 Madden, Mississippi, United States
 Madden Building, a skyscraper in Detroit, Michigan, United States
 Madden Dam, a dam across the Chagres River, in Panama

Other
 Madden baronets, a UK baronetage
 Madden NFL, American football simulation video game series
 Madden NFL Football, American football simulation for the Nintendo 3DS portable game console